The Healers is a Big Finish Productions audio drama based on the long-running British science fiction television series Doctor Who.

Plot 
The galaxy is being ravaged by a deadly plague infection and it appears that the Daleks have the cure.

Cast
Galanar – David Tennant
Selestru – William Gaunt
Siy Tarkov – Steven Elder
Frey Saxton – Ishia Bennison
Kaymee Arnod – Laura Rees
Amur – Claudia Elmhirst
Carneill – Oliver Hume
Dan Culver – Peter Forbes
Japrice – Octavia Walters
Bulis Mietok – Ian Brooker
Telligan – Greg Donaldson
Sergic – Jeremy James
Roozell – Jane Goddard
Chauley – Philip Wolff
Mivas – Dot Smith
Seth – Sean Jackson
Susan Mendes – Sarah Mowatt
Saloran Hardew – Karen Henson
Morli – Dannie Carr
Jake – Colin McIntyre
The Daleks – Nicholas Briggs

External links
Big Finish Productions – The Healers

Dalek Empire audio plays
Audio plays by Nicholas Briggs